SWAC may refer to:

 Scenic West Athletic Conference, an NJCAA conference comprising colleges in the western United States.
 Southwestern Athletic Conference, an NCAA Football Championship Subdivision conference comprising historically black universities
 Standards Western Automatic Computer
 Staunton, Waynesboro and Augusta County, Virginia
 Seawater air conditioning
 Sonny with a Chance
 Sprint Wireless Advantage Club, a discount program for friends and family of Sprint Employees